Bāb aṣ-Ṣaghīr ("Small Gate"), also called Goristan-e-Ghariban, may refer to one of the seven gates in the Old City of Damascus, and street in the modern city of Damascus, Syria. It has qubûr (graves) on either side of the road, and is located in the Dimashq Neighborhood, southwest of the Umayyad Mosque.

History
The bāb (gate) was initially built by the Arameans, then it was dedicated to Zeus during the Seleucid era. During the Roman era, the gate was dedicated to Jupiter.

Cemetery

Maqbarah al-Bāb aṣ-Ṣaghīr is the ancient maqbarah (cemetery) which is adjacent to the gate and a site of significant religious importance to the Muslims.

See also

 Holiest sites in Shia Islam
 Jannatul Baqee
 Jannatul Mualla
 Religious significance of the Syrian region
 Sayyidah Ruqayya Mosque
 Sayyidah Zaynab Mosque

References

External links
 TripAdvisor: Photo: "The Ahl-e-Bait cemetery, also called Bab-al-Saghir"
 Syria conflict: Damascus twin bombing kills 40 Iraqis

Cemeteries in Syria
Buildings and structures in Damascus
Family of Muhammad
Islamic shrines
Gates of Damascus
Streets in Damascus